Constantin Dăscălescu (2 July 1923 – 15 May 2003) was a Romanian communist politician who served as Prime Minister of Romania (21 May 1982 – 22 December 1989) during the communist rule of Nicolae Ceaușescu until the Romanian Revolution.

He was born in Breaza de Sus, Prahova County, the son of Nicolae and Stanca Dăscălescu. From 1937 to 1941 he trained as a metal lathe operator at a vocational school in his hometown, after which he started working at the Astra Română company in Câmpina.  In October 1945 he joined the Romanian Communist Party (PCR), and stayed on his job until November 1947. From 1949 to 1962 he studied at various schools for communist cadres: in Ploiești, at the Ștefan Gheorghiu Academy in Bucharest, and at the International Lenin School in Moscow. At the same time, he advanced in the PCR hierarchy, and served as First Secretary of the Communist Party in Galați from 1965 to 1974.

He resigned from his position as Prime Minister under pressure from the revolutionaries gathered at the headquarters of the Central Committee of the PCR, right after Ceaușescu escaped from the building. In 1991, after the revolution, Dăscălescu was sentenced to life in prison. After five years he was released on medical grounds.

References

External links
 

1923 births
2003 deaths
People from Breaza
Romanian communists
People of the Romanian Revolution
Prime Ministers of Romania
Romanian politicians convicted of crimes
Prisoners sentenced to life imprisonment by Romania
International Lenin School alumni
Heads of government who were later imprisoned